Paul William Goodman (February 25, 1905 – October 1, 1959) was a Canadian ice hockey goaltender and politician who played three seasons in the NHL with the Chicago Black Hawks.

Career 
During the 1938 Stanley Cup Finals, Mike Karakas, the regular Black Hawks goaltender, was injured and unable to play in game one. Chicago used substitution goalie Alfie Moore. The Black Hawks won the game 3–1 over the Toronto Maple Leafs. Toronto then refused to let Moore play the next game, but agreed to allow Goodman to play. Chicago lost 5–1 to Toronto. Karakas returned from injuries to win the next two games. Chicago became the first of only two teams (see 1949 Toronto) to win the Stanley Cup with a losing record. Chicago included Goodman name on the Stanley Cup in 1938 for his efforts.

Goodman was a member of Winnipeg City Council from 1954 to 1959, and unsuccessfully contested the 1958 Manitoba general election as a member of the Manitoba Liberal Party in Winnipeg Centre.

Awards and achievements
Stanley Cup Championship (1938)
“Honoured Member” of the Manitoba Hockey Hall of Fame

References

External links

1905 births
1959 deaths
Canadian ice hockey goaltenders
Chicago Blackhawks players
Ice hockey people from Manitoba
Sportspeople from Selkirk, Manitoba
Stanley Cup champions
Winnipeg city councillors